Rajasthan Council of Educational Administration and Management (RCEAM) affiliated to Commonwealth Council for Educational Administration and Management (CCEAM) is an organization in Udaipur, Rajasthan, India.

History 
It was established in 1995. It's working in the field of educational administration, management, leadership, human rights, women empowerment and education of SC/ ST and weaker sections of the Society.

References

External links 
 Official website

1995 establishments in Rajasthan
Organisations based in Udaipur
Non-profit organisations based in India